Jonathan Sutherland Harding (born 1958) is a freshwater ecologist   from New Zealand. He is a Professor Emeritus of the University of Canterbury. Harding completed his PhD (1995) and DSc (2018) at the University of Canterbury. 
He served as Dean of Postgraduate Research at Canterbury and was President of the New Zealand Freshwater Sciences Society. Harding is a Senior Fellow of the Higher Education Academy, a member of the Ako Aotearoa Academy and an Honorary member of the New Zealand Freshwater Sciences Society.

Publications
Harding JS, Benfield EF, Bolstad PV, Helfman GS, Jones EB. Stream biodiversity: the ghost of land use past. Proceedings of the National Academy of Sciences. 1998 Dec 8;95(25):14843-7. According to Google Scholar, this article has been cited 1202   times    
Harding JS, Young RG, Hayes JW, Shearer KA, Stark JD. Changes in agricultural intensity and river health along a river continuum. Freshwater Biology. 1999 Sep;42(2):345-57. According to Google Scholar, it has been cited 272 times. 
Ewers RM, Kliskey AD, Walker S, Rutledge D, Harding JS, Didham RK. Past and future trajectories of forest loss in New Zealand. Biological Conservation. 2006 Dec 1;133(3):312-2. According to Google Scholar, this article has been cited  217 times    
Buss DF, Carlisle DM, Chon TS, Culp J, Harding JS, Keizer-Vlek HE, Robinson WA, Strachan S, Thirion C, Hughes RM. Stream biomonitoring using macroinvertebrates around the globe: a comparison of large-scale programs. Environmental Monitoring and Assessment. 2015 Jan;187(1):1-21 According to Google Scholar, this article has been cited  201 times    
Burdon FJ, McIntosh AR, Harding JS. Habitat loss drives threshold response of benthic invertebrate communities to deposited sediment in agricultural streams. Ecological Applications. 2013 Jul;23(5):1036-47. According to Google Scholar, this article has been cited 176  times    
Hogsden KL, Harding JS. Consequences of acid mine drainage for the structure and function of benthic stream communities: a review. Freshwater Science. 2012 Mar;31(1):108-20.According to Google Scholar, this article has been cited 172   times

References

New Zealand ecologists
University of Canterbury alumni
Academic staff of the University of Canterbury
1958 births
Living people